Larsen Bay is a city in Kodiak Island Borough, Alaska, United States. At the 2010 census the population was 87, down from 115 in 2000.

Geography
Larsen Bay is located at  (57.536651, -153.991440).

Climate

History
Larsen Bay was named in honor of local hunter and sailor Peter Adolf Larsen, a Danish immigrant. Larsen was born in 1862 on the Danish island of Lolland and died in 1940 on Unga Island.

Larsen Bay first appeared on the 1940 U.S. Census as an unincorporated village. It formally incorporated as a city in 1974.

Demographics

As of the census of 2000, there were 115 people, 40 households, and 26 families residing in the city. The population density was 21.1 people per square mile (8.2/km2). There were 70 housing units at an average density of 12.9 per square mile (5.0/km2). The racial makeup of the city was 20.87% White, 78.26% Native American, and 0.87% from two or more races.

There were 40 households, out of which 42.5% had children under the age of 18 living with them, 45.0% were married couples living together, 12.5% had a female householder with no husband present, and 35.0% were non-families. 27.5% of all households were made up of individuals, and 5.0% had someone living alone who was 65 years of age or older. The average household size was 2.88 and the average family size was 3.54.

In the city, the age distribution of the population shows 38.3% under the age of 18, 4.3% from 18 to 24, 28.7% from 25 to 44, 19.1% from 45 to 64, and 9.6% who were 65 years of age or older. The median age was 29 years. For every 100 females, there were 113.0 males. For every 100 females age 18 and over, there were 102.9 males.

The median income for a household in the city was $40,833, and the median income for a family was $30,000. Males had a median income of $31,250 versus $50,625 for females. The per capita income for the city was $16,227. There were 27.3% of families and 20.5% of the population living below the poverty line, including 22.6% of under eighteen and 33.3% of those over 64.

Education
The Larsen Bay School, a K-12 rural school, is operated by the Kodiak Island Borough School District. The school was closed for the 2018-2019 school year.

References

Cities in Alaska
Cities in Kodiak Island Borough, Alaska
Populated coastal places in Alaska on the Pacific Ocean
Road-inaccessible communities of Alaska